Kirill Teiter (25 August 1952 – 20 May 2022) was an Estonian politician and humorist. Teiter was born in Tallinn on 25 August 1952. He was a member of VII Riigikogu. Teiter died on 20 May 2022, aged 69.

References

1952 births
2022 deaths
Estonian politicians
Estonian humorists
Estonian journalists
Tallinn University of Technology alumni
University of Tartu alumni
Members of the Riigikogu, 1992–1995
Politicians from Tallinn